Anachis ryalli is a species of sea snail in the family Columbellidae, the dove snails.

References

 Rolàn, E., 2005. - Columbellidae (Gastropoda, Neogastropoda) of the gulf of Guinea with the description of eight new species. Iberus 23(2): 119-156

ryalli
Gastropods described in 2005